La Trinidad could be:

La Trinidad, Benguet, a municipality in the Philippines
La Trinidad, Buenos Aires, a settlement in General Arenales Partido in Argentina
La Trinidad, Estelí, a municipality in the Estelí department of Nicaragua
La Trinidad, Panama